The ITTF World Tour Grand Finals, formerly named ITTF Pro Tour Grand Finals, is an annual table tennis tournament sanctioned by International Table Tennis Federation (ITTF) at the end of the year. The tournament includes seven events: men's and women's singles, men's and women's doubles, mixed doubles (new in 2018), U21 men's and women's singles. Players who accumulated the largest number of points on the ITTF World Tour are qualified for the event, and competing for total prize money of US$1,000,000, the biggest total prize money event in the ITTF calendar.

Qualification сriteria

Men's and women's singles
Attend at least 5 events at ITTF World Tour.
The top 15 men and 15 women who have accumulated the largest number of points on World Tour standing are invited.
The ITTF will invite one player from to the host association provided that they played at least 5 events at ITTF World Tour.
If a player from the host association is already among the 15 invited players or no player from the host association had attended at least 5 events at ITTF World Tour, then the 16th player in order will be invited.

Men's and women's doubles
The same pair has to play at least 4 events at ITTF World Tour.
The top 7 men's and 7 women's doubles pairs who have accumulated the largest number of points, as a pair, on World Tour standing are invited.
The ITTF will invite one pair from the host association given that the pair played at least 4 events at ITTF World Tour.
If a pair from the host association is already among the 7 invited pairs or no pair from the host association had attended at least 4 events at ITTF World Tour, then the 8th pair in order will be invited.
If a player appears in two or more double pairs, only the highest double will be qualified.

Mixed doubles 
The same pair has to play at least 2 events at ITTF World Tour.
The top 7 doubles who have accumulated the largest number of points, as a pair, on World Tour standing are invited.
The ITTF will invite one pair from the host association given that the pair played at least 2 events at ITTF World Tour.
If a pair from the host association is already among the 7 invited pairs or no pair from the host association had attended at least 2 events at ITTF World Tour, then the 8th pair in order will be invited.
If a player appears in two or more double pairs, only the highest double will be qualified.

U21 men's and women's singles
Attend 4 events in at least 2 continents at ITTF World Tour.
The top 8 on the World Tour standing are qualified.

If more than 1 player or pair have the same ranking on the World Tour standing when they compete for the last spot, the spot belongs to the player or the pair with higher ITTF world ranking.

Playing systems
All the matches in World Tour Grand Finals are played best of 7 games with the exception of the first round of men's doubles and women's doubles, which are played as a best of 5 games.

Seeding of the players and pairs are determined by the final order of the World Tour standings.

Men's and women's singles, doubles
16 players (or 8 pairs in doubles) advance towards next round under a knockout system. The top 8 players (or the top 4 pairs in doubles) on the World Tour standing will avoid playing each other in the first round.

U21 men's and women's singles
8 players are at first separated into two groups. After playing a round-robin, the top 2 players in each group advance towards a knockout.

Winners

List of winners at ITTF World Tour Grand Finals:

See also
ITTF World Tour

References

External links
ITTF World Tour
ITTF Statistics

 
+